The pair skating competition in figure skating at the 2022 Winter Olympics was held on 18 February (short program) and 19 February (free skating), at the Capital Indoor Stadium in Haidian District of Beijing. Sui Wenjing / Han Cong of China, the 2018 silver medalists, won the event. Evgenia Tarasova / Vladimir Morozov, representing the Russian Olympic Committee, won silver, and Anastasia Mishina / Aleksandr Galliamov, also of ROC, bronze.

Summary
The 2018 champions, Aljona Savchenko / Bruno Massot of Germany, retired from competition. The bronze medalist Meagan Duhamel retired as well, whereas her partner Eric Radford, together with his new partner Vanessa James, qualified for the Olympics. The silver medalists, Sui Wenjing / Han Cong, qualified for the Olympics and had the fourth highest score in the 2021–22 season before the Olympics behind three Russian pairs: Anastasia Mishina / Aleksandr Galliamov, Evgenia Tarasova / Vladimir Morozov, and Aleksandra Boikova / Dmitrii Kozlovskii. At the 2022 European Figure Skating Championships, first Tarasova/Morozov, and then Mishina/Galliamov broke the world record scores. Mishina/Galliamov were the 2021 World champions. The Russians and home favorites Sui/Han were considered the most likely gold medal contenders.

Laura Barquero of Spain failed the doping test, as announced after the closing of the Olympics.

Records

Prior to the competition, the existing ISU best scores were:

The following new best scores were set during this competition:

Qualification

Schedule

Results

Short program
The short program was held on 18 February.

Free skating
The free skating was held on 19 February.

 Notes:
 TSS – Total Segment Score; TES – Technical Element Score; PCS – Program Component Score
 SS – Skating Skills; TR – Transitions; PE – Performance/Execution
 CO – Composition; IN – Interpretation; Ded – Deduction; StN – Starting Number

Overall
The skaters are ranked according to their overall score.

References

Figure skating at the 2022 Winter Olympics
Mixed events at the 2022 Winter Olympics